State Route 4 (SR 4) is a state highway in the U.S. state of California, routed from Interstate 80 in the San Francisco Bay Area to State Route 89 in the Sierra Nevada. It roughly parallels the Sacramento-San Joaquin River Delta, a popular area for boating and fishing, with a number of accesses to marinas and other attractions. After crossing the Central Valley, the highway ascends up the Sierra foothills. It passes through Ebbetts Pass and contains the Ebbetts Pass Scenic Byway, a National Scenic Byway.

Route description

 
SR 4, an east–west highway, begins in Hercules at San Pablo Avenue next to the Interstate 80 junction as part of John Muir Parkway. (The actual parkway extends a bit past the western terminus.) The road is an expressway from its starting point until it approaches Martinez, at which point it becomes a full freeway (the California Delta Highway) passing Concord, Pittsburg, and Antioch. The John Muir National Historic Site is located directly north of Route 4 on Alhambra Avenue in Martinez. Alhambra Avenue at SR 4 is also the site of the Franklin Canyon Adobe. Two gauges of BART tracks run in the median of the freeway from the Port Chicago Highway interchange in Concord to just east of the Hillcrest Avenue interchange in Antioch, where the light rail line currently ends at the Antioch station. After Antioch, the freeway turns southward at its intersection with State Route 160, turning into a suburban and rural road bypassing the Bay Area's rapidly growing and outermost eastern suburbs (Oakley, Brentwood and Discovery Bay, California); and continues east across Victoria Island. This section is also known as the John Marsh Heritage Highway.

Route 4 east continues to Stockton, where it briefly joins I-5 and then enters a separate freeway (known locally as the Crosstown Freeway) routing almost directly through downtown Stockton. The route then runs concurrent with State Route 99 before running eastward into the Sierra through Angels Camp, one of the richest quartz mining sections of the Mother Lode and home of "The Celebrated Jumping Frog of Calaveras County", and Calaveras Big Trees State Park. However, "To SR 4" signage continues along southbound SR 89 north to near its intersection with SR 88 in Woodfords, including reassurance shields for both SR 89 and SR 4 on top of the mileage sign just south of town. The portion from Arnold to its terminus is designated the Ebbetts Pass Scenic Byway, which is eventually one lane.

Through the mountains, SR 4 is not suitable for large trucks, buses, or RVs, as it becomes very steep and eventually single-track, with no center dividing line shortly after the Mount Reba Turnoff to Bear Valley Ski area, with tight switchbacks. Ebbetts Pass is not plowed for snow, and thus closes during the winter months, often from November through as late as May, blocking through traffic between the Mount Reba Turnoff and Markleeville.

SR 4 is part of the California Freeway and Expressway System, and from just west of Stockton to SR 49 is part of the National Highway System, a network of highways that are considered essential to the country's economy, defense, and mobility by the Federal Highway Administration. SR 4 is eligible to be included in the State Scenic Highway System; however, it is only a scenic highway as designated by Caltrans from a point east of Arnold to SR 89, meaning that it is a substantial section of highway passing through a "memorable landscape" with no "visual intrusions", where the potential designation has gained popular favor with the community. SR 4 is also known as part of the John Muir Parkway from I-80 in Hercules to I-680 near Martinez, named for the environmentalist John Muir. The stretch through Franklin Canyon was once known as "Blood Alley".

History
Although segments of Route 4 had been part of the state highway system since 1909, Route 4 was officially designated as such between US Route 40 (now Interstate 80) and State Route 99 in 1934. Prior to that date, the then-existing segment was officially known as the "Borden Highway", and the bridge over the San Joaquin River is still referred to as the "Borden Highway Bridge" in tidal tables. Construction of Route 4 did not finish until 1935, however.

The portion of Route 4 from US Route 40 to State Route 24 was added to the highway system in 1933 as Legislative Route Number (LRN) 106. East of the concurrency with State Route 24 to State Route 49, Route 4 was designated as LRN 75 from 1931 to 1934. Finally, the segment from State Route 49 to State Route 89 was signed as LRN 24 from 1909 to 1934.

In the 1970s, a significant portion of the Filipino American community of "Little Manila" in Stockton was demolished when the "Crosstown Freeway" was constructed, displacing what was once the largest population of Filipinos outside of the Philippines. The freeway, while not yet designated SR 4, was initially constructed from a long-term temporary west end at Fresno Avenue, past I-5, up to a temporary east end at Stanislaus Street, essentially becoming a "freeway to nowhere." In 1993, construction of the Crosstown Freeway from Stanislaus Street to SR 99 was finally completed. It is officially the Ort J. Lofthus Freeway for which it is named after the local civic leader lobbied to get construction of the freeway finished. SR 4, which originally was routed on Charter Way (now Dr. Martin Luther King Jr. Boulevard) and portions of Mariposa and Farmington Roads, transferred its designation onto the Crosstown between I-5 and SR 99. In December 2016, the Crosstown Freeway west of I-5 (though technically not part of SR 4) was extended to Navy Drive via a viaduct bypassing the Boggs Tract neighborhood in Stockton. The connection to Fresno Avenue was subsequently closed to traffic permanently. This was to alleviate heavy traffic to and from the Port of Stockton that plagued the Boggs Tract neighborhood for several decades. Despite being in the planning books for decades, it is unclear if the Crosstown Freeway past Navy Drive will ever be extended to SR 4 west of Stockton.

From 1998 to 2009, a road built by the State Route 4 Bypass Authority, named the State Route 4 Bypass, opened in three phases, bypassing Route 4 in Oakley and Brentwood to the south and west. Many of the signs and local maps designated this extension as simply "Bypass Road". A section of Marsh Creek Road was widened to serve as the connection between the bypass built by the authority and the original Route 4 towards Stockton. In 2012, Caltrans handed over authority for State Route 4 in Oakley and Brentwood to the respective cities. In return, it gained control of the bypass and the upgraded section of Marsh Creek Road, which officially became State Route 4.

Construction is currently underway on widening the freeway section of Route 4 through Antioch, Oakley and Brentwood, with the final configuration as three mixed use lanes and one High Occupancy Vehicle (HOV) lane in each direction and auxiliary lanes between interchanges as far as the interchange with Route 160. The median accommodates the eBART extension of the Bay Area Rapid Transit (BART) system. All work at the Loveridge Road and Somersville Road/Auto Center Drive interchanges has been completed; however, the HOV lane east of the Loveridge Road overpass remains closed pending completion of construction at the L Street/Contra Loma Boulevard and A Street/Lone Tree Way interchanges.

Only the portion of the bypass from SR 160 to the Balfour Road interchange is a multi-lane freeway. The portion from Balfour Road to Vasco Road is single-lane each way and has a signal-controlled grade crossing at Marsh Creek Road. In May 2010, this narrow stretch of the road handled 27,000 to 30,000 vehicles per day. In 2011, Caltrans awarded $25 million toward upgrading the section from Lone Tree Way to Sand Creek Road to a full freeway and constructing an interchange at Sand Creek Road.

Soon after the Sand Creek interchange was opened in Brentwood in 2015, construction began on widening SR 4 to Balfour Road, the next major interchange planned for Brentwood. In 2017, work commenced on the Balfour interchange, which provided a 2-lane overpass for SR 4 and widened it a short distance beyond the Balfour exit.

In early March 2016, reconfiguration of the intersection of SR 4 and SR 160 was officially opened, allowing westbound SR 4 traffic to access northbound SR 160 directly and southbound SR 160 to access eastbound SR 4.

The freeway segment of SR 4 in Stockton is part of a proposed route to upgrade SR 99 into I-7 or I-9. Under one proposal, the new interstate would go along SR 99 from the split with I-5 at Wheeler Ridge north through Fresno to Stockton, where the proposed route would then turn west via the SR 4 freeway to a terminus at I-5.

In 2016, Pittsburg moved to install surveillance cameras along their portion of the route, in response to a series of 20 freeway shootings in the area that had taken the lives of six people, and injured 11, in the past year.

Major intersections

Angels Camp business route

State Route 4 Business is a locally maintained business loop within the city of Angels Camp, California. It was established in August 2013 to attract customers to businesses along the parent route's former alignment, prior to the completion of the Angels Camp Bypass. It runs along South Main Street (co-signed with State Route 49), between State Route 4 and Vallecito Road, then turns east along Vallecito Road.

SR-4/I-680 interchange improvements
On February 1, 2019, the Brentwood Press newspaper reported that officials representing the Contra Costa Transportation Authority (CCTA) and the California Department of Transportation (Caltrans) had held a groundbreaking ceremony to start a project that is intended to reduce congestion at the SR 4/I-680 interchange just outside Martinez. The multiphase project will widen SR 4 by adding a third lane in each direction, beginning at Morello Avenue in Martinez and ending at the merge of SR 4 and SR 242. It will also include replacing the 50-year-old Grayson Creek Bridge, which has outlived its serviceable life and does not meet current bridge safety codes. Although no schedule or end date has been announced, the officials said that the estimated cost is about $136 million (in 2018 dollars).

Notes

See also

References

External links

California @ AARoads.com – State Route 4
Caltrans: Route 4 highway conditions
California Highways: Route 4
Ebbetts Pass Scenic Byway
Scenic 4 - Ebbetts Pass Scenic Byway
Cal-NExUS: Route 4

004
004
004
State Route 004
State Route 004
State Route 004
State Route 004
State Route 004
004